Scythris sciochalca is a moth of the family Scythrididae. It was described by Edward Meyrick in 1928. It is found in Uganda.

The wingspan is about 12 mm. The forewings are greyish-bronzy and the hindwings are dark grey.

References

sciochalca
Moths described in 1928